Mary Percy may refer to:
Mary Percy, Countess of Northumberland, née Talbot
Mary Percy (abbess) (1570–1642)
Mary Percy Jackson, née Mary Percy